For the 20th edition of the Four Hills Tournament, the FIS deviated from the traditional order of events and started the tour in Innsbruck. The overall winner was Norwegian Ingolf Mork. In the previous year, Mork won three out of four events while only placing second overall.

Before the tournament started, the Japanese team already announced that they would only participate in the first three events before returning to Japan in order to prepare for the 1972 Winter Olympics in Sapporo five weeks later. This decision ended up taking the tournee victory from Yukio Kasaya, who won all three events he participated in, and had a lead of 50.4 points to Mork. He would have been the first non-European tour winner. The preparation paid off: The Japanese took all three medals at the Olympic Normal hill event, Kasaya winning Gold.

Participating nations and athletes

A Bulgarian jumper competed for the first time. The Japanese team did not sign up for the final event in Bischofshofen.

Results

Innsbruck
 Bergiselschanze, Innsbruck
29 December 1971

Yukio Kasaya, who was in dominating form in the winter of 1971/72, became the first Non-European to win an event at the Four Hills Tournament. The Czechoslovakian and Norwegian teams disappointed with modest results for several tournament favourites, among them title holder Jiří Raška (12th), Ingolf Mork (22nd) and three-time competition winner Bjørn Wirkola (44th).

Garmisch-Partenkirchen
 Große Olympiaschanze, Garmisch-Partenkirchen
1 January 1972

Oberstdorf
 Schattenbergschanze, Oberstdorf
2 January 1972

Bischofshofen
 Paul-Ausserleitner-Schanze, Bischofshofen
6 January 1972

Not taking Kasaya into account, who would not compete at Bischofshofen, the leading field was close together. Mork, who was leading Käyhkö with a margin of 1.2 points, saw his closest competitors struggle: Käyhkö (31st), R. Schmidt (56th), Kalinin (21st).

Veteran Zakadze finished in the Top Ten, precisely sixteen years after his first victory at a Four Hills event.

Final ranking

References

External links
 FIS website
 Four Hills Tournament web site

Four Hills Tournament
1971 in ski jumping
1972 in ski jumping